Jana Vanaveski (born in 1971 in Tallinn) is an Estonian diplomat. 

In 1993 she graduated from Tallinn University of Technology. In 1995 she graduated from School of International Relationships in Amsterdam.

Since 1993 she is working for Estonian Foreign Ministry. Since 2016 to 2020 she was Ambassador of Estonia to Lithuania. 

Awards: 
 2013: Lithuanian order of precedence.

References

Living people
1971 births
Estonian women diplomats
Ambassadors of Estonia to Lithuania
Tallinn University of Technology alumni
People from Tallinn